Ross Township is one of fifteen townships in Edgar County, Illinois, USA.  As of the 2010 census, its population was 1,594 and it contained 773 housing units.

Geography

Cities, towns, villages
 Chrisman

Unincorporated communities
 Woodyard

Extinct towns

 Cherry Point
 Mabel
 Mortimer
 Scotts

Cemeteries

 Bacon (small)
 Gaines
 Ross
 Woodland

Major highways
  US Route 36
  US Route 150
  Illinois Route 1

Demographics

School districts
 Edgar County Community Unit District 6

Political districts
 Illinois's 15th congressional district
 State House District 109
 State Senate District 55

References
 
 US Census Bureau 2007 TIGER/Line Shapefiles
 US National Atlas

External links
 City-Data.com
 Illinois State Archives
 Edgar County Official Site

Townships in Edgar County, Illinois
Townships in Illinois